The Consolidated Vultee XP-81 (later redesignated ZXF-81) is a development of the Consolidated Vultee Aircraft Corporation to build a single seat, long range escort fighter that combined use of both turbojet and turboprop engines. Although promising, the lack of suitable engines combined with the end of World War II doomed the project.

Design and development
Two prototype aircraft were ordered on 11 February 1944 that were designated XP-81. The engine selection was an attempt to couple the high-speed capability of the jet engine with the endurance offered by the propeller engine. The XP-81 was designed to use the General Electric TG-100 turboprop engine (later designated XT31 by the US military) in the nose driving a four-bladed propeller and a GE J33 turbojet in the rear fuselage. The turboprop would be used for normal flight and cruising and the turbojet added for high-speed flight.

Operational history

The first XP-81 (serial 44-91000) was completed in January 1945 but because of developmental problems the turboprop engine was not ready for installation. A decision was then made to mount a complete V-1650-7 engine package from a P-51D aircraft in place of the turboprop for initial flight tests. This was done in a week and the Merlin-powered XP-81 was sent to the Muroc airbase where it flew for the first time on 11 February 1945. During 10 flight test hours, the XP-81 displayed good handling characteristics except for inadequate directional stability due to the longer forward portion of the fuselage (this was rectified by enlarging the vertical tail).

While 13 YP-81 pre-production aircraft had been ordered, the capture of Guam and Saipan eliminated the need for long-range, high-speed escort fighters and then, just before VJ Day the contract was cancelled, after 85% of the engineering was completed. The YP-81 was to be essentially the same as the prototype but with a lighter and more powerful GE TG-110 (XT41) turboprop engine, the wing moved aft 10 inches (0.25 m), and armament of either six .50 cal (12.7 mm) machine guns or six 20 mm cannon.

After the XP-81 was returned to Vultee Field, the TG-100 turboprop was installed and flight testing resumed, including the first flight by an American turboprop-powered aircraft on 21 December 1945. However, the turboprop engine was not able to produce its designed power; producing only the same output as the Merlin (1,490 hp or 1112 kW) with the resultant performance limited to that of the Merlin-engined version.

With the termination of hostilities, the two prototypes continued to be tested until 1947 when they were both consigned to a bombing range as photography targets.

Surviving aircraft
Both prototypes are in storage at the National Museum of the United States Air Force near Dayton, Ohio.

Operators

 United States Army Air Forces (testing only)

Specifications (XP-81)
Note: Performance is estimated with "full powered" TG-100. Armament is projected only.

See also

Notes

Bibliography

 

Mixed-power aircraft
Consolidated Vultee P-81
P-081
Low-wing aircraft
Aircraft first flown in 1945